Promised Heaven is a 1991 Soviet film directed by Eldar Ryazanov. The film is a fantastical social tragicomedy.

Plot
The movie is set in against the dusk of the Soviet Union and associated changes in economical and social life. Near one of Moscow's train stations, on a landfill site, a group of vagrants lives. Due to a variety of reasons, once prosperous people have lost their jobs, homes, loved ones and began living at a landfill. Among them are: Anthemia, a talented artist; her brother Fedor Yelistratov, who was repressed in the days of Stalinism; Solomon, a former engineer, who lost his job because his family emigrated to Israel; and  former cook and housemaid Katya, who was beaten and kicked out of her house by her drunkard son. The head of those unfortunate people is "President" - a former party worker Dmitry Loginov, who like his friend Fedor, was in Stalin's camps.

One night the President tells his friends incredible news. He allegedly had contact with aliens, who promised to take all those people to their planet - to the place where happiness, joy and peace rule. At the right day and hour of the homeless are supposed to receive the signal from the "visitors from the sky": blue snow shall fall.

They prepare  for a long trip, but authorities are going to liquidate the landfill site to build a condom factory. The President and other inhabitants of the landfill are trying to protect their home, but the authorities in their pursuit to liquidate the camp of homeless people are ready to do anything.

At a winter night, "blue" snow begins to fall from the sky. The President and his "fellow citizens" go out to meet the good aliens, but they see heavily armed police squads and tanks approaching them that should raze vagrants' shacks to the ground.

Desperate people load on the old steam train, power it up and as it gains speed, it takes off the ground, to the Promised Heavens.

Cast
 Liya Akhedzhakova as  Anthemia Stepanovna (Phima), woman artist
 Olga Volkova as   Katya Ivanova, former cook and housemaid
 Valentin Gaft as   Dmitry Loginov, former party worker, leader of tramps (President)
 Leonid Bronevoy as   Semyon Yefremovich Bakurin, Soviet Army colonel retired
 Oleg Basilashvili as   Fedor Stepanovich Yelistratov, Phima's brother
 Svetlana Nemolyaeva as    Aglaya Sviderskaya, former party worker, Loginov's former wife
 Sergei Artsibashev as    Kirill, Katya Ivanova's eldest son / Kirill Grigorievich, large party official
 Mikhail Filippov as    Vasya, Katya Ivanova's younger son / Vasily Ilyich Prokhorov, large party official
 Natalya Gundareva as    Lyuska, Vasya's cohabitant
 Natalia Shchukina as    Jeannа, student, Fedor Yelistratov's wife
 Vyacheslav Nevinny as    Stepan, bum
 Roman Kartsev as    Solomon, bum, Stepan's friend
 Alexander Pashutin as    crazy motorman
 Nina Ruslanova as    Jeanne's aunt, dressmaker from Tver
 Alexander Belyavsky as    Oleg P Mirov, chairman of Regional Executive Committee
 Valery Nosik as    bum
 Stanislav Sadalskiy as    photographer at the wedding
 Lyudmila Ivanova as    Claudia, cat lady
 Tatyana Kravchenko as    matron of the old people's home
 Eldar Ryazanov as    client in a cafe

Awards
 Awards of magazine "Soviet Screen": "Best film of the year" and "Best actress of the year" (1991)
 Nika Award: "Best Movie", "Best Director", "Best Actor in a Supporting Role", "Best Music", "Best Sound", "Best Artistic Direction" (1992)
 Film Critics Award of the film festival "Constellation" (1992)
 Awards of International Film Festival in Madrid: Grand Prix - "Best fiction film" (1992)

References

External links

1991 films
1990s black comedy films
Soviet black comedy films
Mosfilm films
Films directed by Eldar Ryazanov
Films set in Moscow
Films shot in Moscow
Russian black comedy films
1991 comedy films